Maurice Couture,  (November 3, 1926 – January 19, 2018) was a Canadian Catholic bishop as Archbishop of Québec from 1990 until his retirement in 2002. Born in Saint-Pierre-de-Broughton, Quebec, he was ordained a priest in 1951. He was Bishop of Baie-Comeau from  1988 until 1990.

In 2003, he was made a Grand Officer of the National Order of Quebec.

References

External links
 Catholic Hierarchy profile

1926 births
2018 deaths
French Quebecers
Grand Officers of the National Order of Quebec
Roman Catholic archbishops of Quebec
Roman Catholic bishops of Baie-Comeau